Ride On (formerly Ride-On) is the primary public transportation system in Montgomery County, Maryland. Managed by the Montgomery County Department of Transportation, Ride On serves Montgomery County as well as the community of Langley Park in Prince George's County and Sibley Memorial Hospital in Washington, D.C. In fiscal 2018, it operated on a US$112.3 million budget.

Ride On has a fleet of about 400 buses and operates 81 routes, including operating two Metrobus routes on weekends.

History

1970s–1990s 
Ride On began service on March 31, 1975, as Ride-On. Serving Silver Spring and Takoma Park, two routes were in operation: The Blue and the Green.  Within a few weeks it was carrying twice the number of passengers projected: about 2,000 riders per day. The Buses were nineteen passenger Grummans.  Starting in 1983, single front door TMC City Cruisers entered service. These buses were part of a joint order with Frederick City Transit, and shared the same paint livery. In the fall of 1984, as the Washington Metro's Red Line extension to Shady Grove was complete, Ride On would see its largest route expansion to date. Numerous routes would be added to accommodate passengers who would utilize the eight new metrorail stations along the western portion of Montgomery County. At that time, Ride On would begin to replace a few WMATA routes that operated in Montgomery County. OBI Orion I 30' foot buses would be introduced that same year to allow for the added service. In 1989, 57 30-foot Gillig Phantom buses, the first buses in the second-generation blue-and-white scheme, went into service.  In 1991 and 1992, 45 new Orion I 30' buses - Ride On's last Orion Is - entered service.

In the spring of 1996, Ride On's first CNG buses, the 1996 35-foot Orion V buses, went into service. These buses retired in 2009.

2000s 
In 2000, Ride On buses were painted in a special livery to commemorate Ride On's founding's 25th anniversary.

In September 2001, Ride On buses were used to transport Montgomery County firemen to the Pentagon in Virginia to assist in search and rescue operations after the September 11 attacks.

In early 2004, Ride On's first low-floor buses, the 2003–04 35-foot Orion VII CNG buses (5900–5932), went into service. They replaced all of the remaining 1989 30-foot Gillig Phantom buses (which were also Ride On's last buses without wheelchair lifts), therefore resulting in an all-accessible fleet.

In 2006, Ride On started accepting SmarTrip cards.  All of the buses would be equipped with SmarTrip-compatible fare boxes by August of that year.

Also in 2006, Ride On's first five hybrid-electric buses, the 2006 40-foot Gillig Low Floor aka Gillig Advantage buses (5300-5304), went into service. The following year (2007), eight additional 40-foot Gillig Low Floor hybrid-electric buses (5305-5313) went into service.

Between summer and fall 2008, Ride On's first low-floor diesel buses, the 2008 29-foot Gillig Advantage (5001-5006) and 2008 40-foot Gillig Advantage buses (5726–5746), went into service. They are the last buses in the second-generation blue-and-white paint scheme.

In 2009, Ride On introduced a new logo and blue-yellow-green paint scheme with the delivery of new Gillig Advantage clean diesel and hybrid buses.

2010s 
In autumn 2011, Ride On's 12 40-foot Gillig Low Floor hybrid buses (5349–5360) and one clean diesel bus (5758) went into service. All 13 of these buses were purchased with funds from the American Reinvestment and Recovery Act. Seven additional 40' Gillig Low Floor hybrid buses (5361–5367), which were also purchased with stimulus funds from the ARRA, went into service in mid-2012.

In July 2012, Ride On retired all 62 of its 2007 Champion cutaway buses due to fires and replaced them with 30 1999 30-foot Orion V buses. All 30 of these units were formerly operated by Washington's WMATA.

On September 19, 2013, 12 new 40-foot Gillig Low Floor clean diesel buses (5759–5770) went into service. A week later (September 26, 2013), 28 new 29-foot Gillig Low Floor clean diesel buses (5032–5059) also went into service. Also, the 2013 29-foot Gillig Low Floor clean diesel buses replaced all of the 2003 model shuttle transit vehicles (STV) that were formerly operated by Pittsburgh's Port Authority of Allegheny County.

In April 2014, 19 brand-new 2014 40-foot Gillig Low Floor CNG buses (5837–5855) entered service. They are Ride On's first new CNG buses in almost a decade (2005 35' Orion VII CNG buses, which went into service in 2006).

Between September and October 2014, 32 new 29-foot Gillig Low Floor clean diesel buses (5060–5091) went into service and replaced all of the 1998 30-foot Orion V buses that were formerly operated by WMATA.

Ride On celebrated its 40th anniversary in 2015, with 3 buses (1 from each of the 3 bus divisions) wrapped in the transit agency's 40th anniversary ad.

Between April and May 2016, 40 new 40' Gillig LF clean diesel buses (4000-4039), 1 29' Gillig LF clean diesel bus (2000) and 16 40' Gillig LF CNG buses (4040-4055) entered service.  And with the new buses came the new five-digit numbering system for Ride On, along with the addition of suffixes denoting engines with a ("C" for compressed natural gas, "D" for diesel, "E" for electric and "H" for hybrid).

Ride On extRa, a new limited-stop bus service along Maryland Route 355, began on October 2, 2017, between Lakeforest Transit Center and Medical Center Metro Station. , the route serves 13 stops. Ride On added 59 Gillig 40-foot buses in summer and the fall 2017; 42 buses replaced some of the oldest vehicles in the fleet.  Seventeen buses (4056D-4072D) are specially branded and used exclusively for Ride On's new extRa service that began October 2, 2017. This limited-stop service runs along Route 355 from Lakeforest Transit Center to Medical Center Metro Station. All of the 59 buses are manufactured by Gillig; 25 run on clean diesel (4056D-4080D) and 34 use compressed natural gas (4081C-4114C).  Four additional 40-foot CNG buses (4115C-4118C) entered service in the winter of 2018.

Ride On was award a $1.75 million grant from the Federal Transit Administration to purchase the county's first four electric buses and charging stations. Ride On is partnering with Proterra, the bus manufacturer, and the Center for Transportation and the Environment, a nonprofit that develops technologies and implements solutions to achieve energy and environmental sustainability. The Montgomery County Department of General Services, which purchases and maintains the Ride On buses, greatly assisted with the grant application. The four Proterra Catalyst 35 ft electric buses are scheduled to serve Route 18 in Takoma Park starting in 2019. The county has applied for a separate grant to help buy 10 more electric buses through FTA's Bus and Bus Facilities Infrastructure Investment Program. The county expects to hear back around the end of the year if its application was approved.

MCDOT Ride On received a $4.365 million grant from the FTA to replace diesel buses with 10 new, electric buses on October 1, 2018.

Ride On added 26 Gillig 40-foot buses in spring 2019; replacing all the remaining Orion VII's. These buses introduced a brand new paint scheme with a wave pattern and are painted blue, dark blue, light green, and a touch of white. 23 use compressed natural gas (4119C-4141C) and 3 run on clean diesel (4142D-4144D).

On April 28, 2019, Ride On announced Ride On Flex, an on-demand bus service that runs in three major metropolitan areas in the county using new, 11-passenger cutaway buses.

2020s 
MCDOT has a climate action plan to move to zero-emissions fleet by 2035. On September 4, 2020, Ride On's first four fully-electric buses (3000E-3003E) entered service on routes 18 and 25 in Silver Spring/Takoma Park. They are manufactured by Proterra and can run on a single charge all day long. That same year, 9 Gillig Diesel Buses (4145D-4153D) entered service. These replaced the 2006–2007 Gillig Advantage Hybrid's.

On October 14, 2020, Ride On launched its brand new BRT Flash service on US 29. The orange route operates between Silver Spring and Briggs Chaney every 15 minutes daily while the blue route operates between Silver Spring and Burtonsville every 15 minutes only during peak hours (5:30-8:30 AM and 3:30-7:00 PM) Monday-Friday. Ride On's very first articulated (60 ft) buses (6000D-6015D) operate on the Flash service, which replaced route 129.

Additional services 
Along with standard bus service, Ride On operates three additional services, Ride On extRa, Ride On Flex, and Ride On Flash.

Ride On extRa 

Ride On extRa, a new bus service that started on October 2, 2017, is a limited stop service via Maryland Route 355 between Medical Center station on the Washington Metro's Red Line and the Lakeforest Mall Transit Center. This bus route has free WiFi, USB charging ports, and more padding in the seats compared to traditional Ride On services. The fare charged is the same as on other Ride On buses, although fare loading on the bus is not permitted. , Ride On extRa serves a new stop at Templeton Place in Rockville, increasing the number of bus stops to 13.

Ride On Flex 

Ride On Flex is an on-demand bus service that began serving Montgomery County on June 26, 2019, and runs in and around Rockville, Glenmont, and Wheaton using new, 11-passenger cutaway buses. Passengers are able to request a bus using an app. The new service does not charge a higher fare, and accepts the same payment methods as standard Ride On buses with no onboard fare loading allowed.

Flash BRT 

Flash is a bus rapid transit network that began service on October 14, 2020. The first route runs between Silver Spring and Burtonsville along U.S. Route 29. Additional routes are in development and will likely run along MD 355 between Clarksburg and Bethesda and MD 586 between Rockville and Wheaton. Flash has dedicated stops with prepayment machines and operates in a mix of mixed-traffic and dedicated lanes using articulated buses equipped with Wi-Fi and USB ports. It is the second BRT system in the Washington metropolitan area and the first in Montgomery County.

Fares 
, Ride On's current one-way fare is $1.00 regardless of payment method. Children, senior citizens, and persons with disabilities can ride for free. Fares were suspended from March 2020 to July 2022 in response to COVID-19. Prior to that, Ride On's one-way fare was $2.00 regardless of payment method. Senior citizens and persons with disabilities could ride free on weekdays between 9:30 AM and 3:00 PM, and on Saturdays between 8:30 AM and 4:00 PM; at all other times, a reduced fare of $1.00 was charged. , children ages 5 and up can ride Ride On, as well as Metrobus routes originating in Montgomery County, for free until they graduate from high school by using a Youth Cruiser SmarTrip card. Ride On offers a $0.50 discount for bus fares that transfer from the Washington Metro.

As with all other transit providers in the Washington Metropolitan Area, Ride On stopped the issue or acceptance of paper transfers.  Riders wanting transfer credit must use a SmarTrip card to get the rail-to-bus or bus-to-rail discount or to transfer free from bus to bus.

Fleet 
Ride On operates a fleet consisting of Diesel, CNG, Diesel-electric hybrid, and Battery electric buses produced by Gillig Corporation, Nova Bus, Proterra, and Starcraft.

Retired fleet

Divisions 
The bus fleet, owned and operated by Ride On, is distributed among three garages in Kensington, Silver Spring and Gaithersburg.

Routes 
Ride On offers 81 routes throughout Montgomery County. All routes run through peak rush hour periods between 6 AM and 9 AM and 3 PM to 7 PM on weekdays. Many routes offer services for off-peak hours and weekends as well.

Flash BRT routes

Metrobus routes 
Additionally, Ride On operates two weekend routes that are served by WMATA Metrobus on weekdays.

Former routes 
These routes have been served by Ride On at one point but have since been discontinued due to either low ridership, duplication of another route, simplification to other routes, or combined into another route. However some routes would be reincarnated into new routes for Ride On.

Additionally, Ride On ran one weekend route that is served by WMATA Metrobus on weekdays. This route has since been discontinued due to the same reason as other discontinued Ride On routes.

References

External links 

 
 Oren's Transit Page: Ride On

Bus transportation in Maryland
Transit authorities with natural gas buses
Transportation in Montgomery County, Maryland
1974 introductions